The Duquesne Country and Athletic Club was a professional football team based in Pittsburgh, Pennsylvania from 1895 until 1900. The team was considered one of the best, if not the best, professional football teams in the country from 1898 until 1900. However, the team is most famous for being the first football franchise to be owned by an individual, William Chase Temple.

Origin
The Duquesne Country and Athletic Club, started playing in 1895 and at first intended to use only amateur players. However, after four games, before playing the Pittsburgh Athletic Club, they began hiring stars and soon became the most professional team in the city.

1898
Duquesne fielded the best team in Pittsburgh since 1895. In 1898 the Duquesnes decided to build an even better team. After the 1897 season, the club had signed a number of good players to contracts for the next year. However at this time, many of the players went into the army in the spring to fight in the Spanish–American War. This led the Duquesnes to sign replacements for those players in the army. While this at first looked to be a bad sign for Duquesne for the 1898 season, it later became a blessing in disguise. Many of replacement player that were signed proved to perform better than the originals. Then when the war ended in just a few short months and the original players returned home, the Duquesnes suddenly found themselves with a load of expensive stars. In fact it became apparent that the bench-warmers for the Duquesnes would actually be star players on lesser teams. Those players, end Tommy Randolph, tackle Otto Wagonhurst, guard John Wienstein, and back Don McNeil would have been regulars for the rival Pittsburgh Athletic Club.

All-star game
At the end of the 1898 season, Dave Berry, the manager of the Latrobe Athletic Association came up with the idea fielding a team composed of best players, drawn from all of the other area teams. That team would then play the Duquesnes in an all-star game. Berry was able to get many of the players that he wanted for his all-star team, but not all of them. In Greensburg, local leaders urged players from the Greensburg Athletic Association not to play in the game. Also many other players had baseball to prepare for and did not bother with the game. However, the game was a go and was arranged for Saturday, December 3 at Exposition Park. The Duquesnes would go on to win the game 16–0.

First individual owner
When it became apparent around this time that the Duquesnes could not survive financially while paying its players, William C. Temple, its chairman, took over the team payments becoming the first known individual club owner. However, in early days of professional football, the public wrongly viewed everyone who was playing for an athletic club, as an amateur. So the date of Temple becoming the first owner is still in question, but it is estimated by historians to be between 1898 and 1901. Several histories have tabbed the 1898 season, when the team was suddenly confronted with more players under contract than they'd expected. While others argue for 1899, when several new stars were hired to keep the team on top. The NFL's official chronology states that in 1900 Temple took over the D.C. & A.C. payments. Temple, a local steel magnate, was also a part owner and president of the Pittsburgh Pirates.

Move to Homestead
The Duquesnes had become the best pro team in Pennsylvania and, almost certainly, in the country. In 1900, A.C. Dinkey stole most of the Duquesne players, as well as Temple, for his Homestead Library & Athletic Club, an organization that had existed since 1894 in the Pittsburgh suburb of Homestead, Pennsylvania, offering them higher salaries. Like the Duquesnes, that team became a national powerhouse in football for the next two years. Meanwhile, Duquesne in 1900 found itself posting a financial loss, resulting in the club to fold its professional football team immediately.

References

 
American football teams in Pittsburgh
1895 establishments in Pennsylvania
1900 disestablishments in Pennsylvania
American football teams established in 1895
Sports clubs disestablished in 1900
 Athletic Club football teams and seasons